Wilk is a surname of English and Polish-language origin.

In Poland, the surname means wolf and is pronounced . It has 35,000 bearers in Poland and ranks about 60th on the list of the most popular Polish surnames (fifth in Podkarpackie Voivodeship). It is common in many parts of southern Poland, especially among the Lasowiacy sub-ethnic group. Its variants include Wilczek (a diminutive meaning "little wolf") and Wilczyński, which may also derive from toponyms with the stem wilk.

In English, the surname is a back formation of Wilkin, which originated as a short form of William. English-language variants include Wilkes, Wilke, Wilks, Wilkin, and Wilkins.

The following people bear the surname:
 Adam Wilk (born 1987), American baseball pitcher
 Brad Wilk (born 1968), American musician
 Cezary Wilk (born 1986), Polish footballer
 "General Wilk" (1895–1951), nom de guerre of Aleksander Krzyzanowski
 Jakub Wilk (born 1985), Polish footballer
 Kasia Wilk (born 1982), Polish singer
 Katarzyna Wilk (born 1992), Polish swimmer
 Maurice Wilk (died 1963), American violinist
 Martin Wilk (1922–2013), Canadian statistician, co-author of the Shapiro–Wilk test
 Max Wilk (1920–2011), American playwright, screenwriter and author
 Michael Wilk (born c. 1952), American songwriter
 Rafał Wilk (born 1974), Polish former speedway rider and Paralympic cyclist
 Scott Wilk (born 1959), American politician
 Selene Vigil-Wilk, American singer and musician
 Vic Wilk (born 1960), American professional golfer
 Wojciech Wilk (born 1972), Polish politician

Fictional characters include:
 Jonathan Wilk, the main character in the film Compulsion (1959), played by Orson Welles
 Patricia Wilk, a character in Scrubs

See also

References

English-language surnames
Polish-language surnames
Surnames from given names
Surnames from nicknames